This is a list of members of the Legislative Council in the colonial period from its establishment in 1843 to 1941. It consists of both official and unofficial members. The term of the Legislative Council was interrupted during the Japanese occupation of Hong Kong.

Change in composition

List of Official members

List of Unofficial members

Key:

See also
 List of Executive Council of Hong Kong unofficial members 1896–1941
 List of Legislative Council of Hong Kong unofficial members 1946–1985

References

Bibliography 
 Endacott, G. B. Government and people in Hong Kong, 1841–1962 : a constitutional history Hong Kong University Press. (1964)
 Hong Kong General Chamber of Commerce. Hong Kong General Chamber of Commerce 1925: Annual Report. (1925)
 Hong Kong General Chamber of Commerce. Hong Kong General Chamber of Commerce 1966: Annual Report. (1966)